The White Wall is a 1975 Swedish drama film written and directed by Stig Björkman. It was entered into the 9th Moscow International Film Festival where Harriet Andersson won the award for Best Actress.

Cast
 Harriet Andersson as Monika Larsson
 Lena Nyman as Berit
 Sven Wollter as Kjell Larsson
 Tomas Pontén as Arne Blomgren
 Rolf Larsson as Göran Engström
 Palle Granditsky as Bengtsson
 Theodor Kallifatides as Giorgos
 Martin Jonsson as Patrik Larsson
 Leif Ahrle
 Olle Björling as Salesman
 Gösta Bredefeldt as Mona's Father
 Tina Hedström as Mona's Mother
 Josefin Hodén as Mona

References

External links
 
 

1975 films
1975 drama films
Swedish drama films
1970s Swedish-language films
Films directed by Stig Björkman
1970s Swedish films